"Feel the Fiyaaaah" is a song by American record producer Metro Boomin and American rapper ASAP Rocky featuring late American rapper Takeoff, from the former's second studio album Heroes & Villains (2022). The song contains a sample of "Feel the Fire" by Peabo Bryson.

Critical reception
The song was met with a generally positive reception. Robin Murray of Clash wrote that it seems to encapsulate the album's "over-the-top ambitions, while a feature from the late, great Takeoff is swathed in a sense of loss." Slant Magazine's Charles Lyons-Burt criticized the production, writing that "Metro is often just going about recycling what's worked on tracks that he's produced in the past" and regarding the song's pitched-up sample as reminiscent of his song "Runnin", but also commented that the song features "committed" performances from ASAP Rocky and Takeoff. Mic Cheque's Hamza Riaz wrote in a review of Heroes & Villains, "There's no sensational beat that holds a candle to production like Without Warning's "Rap Saved Me" or the layers of "Don't Come Out the House", citing "Feel the Fiyaaaah" as one of the "closest moments". Wongo Okon of Uproxx wrote, "In totality, the flashy 'Feel The Fiyaaah' with ASAP Rocky and the late Takeoff exemplifies the album's brightest moments". Complex's Peter A. Berry praised the rappers' performances, writing that Rocky "laces throwback chipmunk soul with an off-kilter melody that works better than you think" and "On the same track, the late Takeoff cycles through much of the alphabet for a wordplay exhibition that will remind you of the massive talent that was lost after his tragic death last month."

Charts

References

2022 songs
Metro Boomin songs
ASAP Rocky songs
Takeoff (rapper) songs
Songs written by Metro Boomin
Songs written by ASAP Rocky
Songs written by Takeoff (rapper)
Songs written by Thundercat (musician)
Song recordings produced by Metro Boomin